Diego da Conceição de Araújo, O.E.S.A. (1549–1597) was a Roman Catholic prelate who served as an auxiliary bishop in the Archdiocese of Goa (1595–1597).

Biography
João da Rocha was born in Vila Viçosa in 1549 and ordained a priest in the Order of Saint Augustine.  
On 13 Nov 1595, he was appointed during the papacy of Pope Clement VIII as Titular Archbishop of Calama.
In 1596, he was consecrated bishop by Alexeu de Jesu de Meneses, Archbishop of Goa.
He served as auxiliary bishop of the archdiocese until his death in 1597.

References

External links and additional sources
  (for Chronology of Bishops) 
  (for Chronology of Bishops) 

17th-century Roman Catholic bishops in India
Bishops appointed by Pope Clement VIII
1597 deaths
1549 births
Augustinian bishops